Enrico Cannio (1874 in Naples – 1949 in Naples) was an Italian musician and composer.  He initially received a diploma in piano to become an orchestra conductor; he spent his whole life in Naples, and during his career he worked at three singing schools in the city.  He also led three local theater orchestras, at the Eden, the Umberto, and the Trianon.  He wrote for the majority of local song publishers, and collaborated with artists such as Libero Bovio, Ernesto Murolo, and Aniello Califano.  His most popular song, to a text by Califano, was "'O surdato 'nnammurato", published in 1915.  Among his other popular songs, to texts or Libero Bovio, were "A serenata 'e Pulecenella", "Tarantella luciana" and "Carufanella".

Songs
"Oj ma', dammillo" (1901) 
"Carmela mia!" (1903) 
"'E difiette d'e ffemmene" (1907) 
"A fussetella" (1908) 
"'O scialacquone" (1908) 
"A luntananza d'o suldato" (1909) 
"Tarantella luciana" (1913) 
"Carufanella" (1914) 
"Vola e va..." (1914) 
"'O Surdato 'Nnamurato" (1915) 
"Povere figliole" (1915) 
"A serenata 'e Pulecenella" (1916) 
"Canta, Mara" (1916)
"Surdato italiano" (1916) 
"Margaretè" (1917) 
"'O surdato 'e malavita" (1917) 
"Zetella" (1917) 
"Cara sposina" (1918) 
"Passa appriesso" (1918) 
"'O portavoce" (1921) 
"L'appuntamento" (1923) 
"Maistà" (1925) 
"'O squilibrato" (1931) 
"Rusella 'e maggio" (1939).

External links
Enrico Cannio Official Website 
Enrico Cannio at www.interviu.it
"Carmela mia!" available in the collection of the digital library Polona.pl

Bibliography
Ettore de Mura - Enciclopedia della Canzone Napoletana, Casa Editrice IL TORCHIO, Napoli 1969

References
This article is based on a translation of the corresponding article in the Italian Wikipedia.

1874 births
1949 deaths
Italian composers
Italian male composers
Italian songwriters
Male songwriters